Rabbi Moshe Heinemann is an Orthodox rabbi and Posek who heads the Agudath Israel of Baltimore synagogue and is the rabbinical supervisor of the Star K kashrus certification agency. He studied for many years in Beis Midrash Govoha under Rabbi Aharon Kotler, and was ordained by Rabbi Moshe Feinstein.

He was born in Fürth, Germany in 1937. Moshe left with his parents for England shortly after Kristallnacht. They lived in England until the 1950s. 

Rabbi Heinemann is widely consulted for rulings in matters of Halacha, often where complicated technology is involved.  He is an expert Mohel, Shochet, and Sofer, and has trained and certified numerous people in these, as well as other, areas of practical Halacha.  Rabbi Heinemann is also an expert on the construction of Eruvin and mikvehs, and is frequently consulted regarding these complicated areas of Halacha.

Shabbos Mode Ovens

Rabbi Heinemann has ruled for over a decade that, on Yom Tov, one may raise or lower the temperature on Sabbath Mode ovens. In June 2008, a number of prominent Poskim signed a Kol Kore (public pronouncement) stating that this was unequivocally forbidden. The Kol Kore referred to the lenient opinion  as a Daas Yachid (a minority opinion that should not be relied upon - literally: the opinion of an individual).  After the Kol Kore was released, it was rumored by some that Rabbi Heineman retracted his opinion regarding this issue and ruled like the Israeli Poskim.  However, no written record of his retraction exists, and the website of the Star-K, the Supervision Agency that is governed by Rabbi Heinemann's rulings, continues to promote Rabbi Heinemann's view. It has been noted that Rabbi Heinemann's opinion is consistent with the rulings of Rabbi Shlomo Zalman Auerbach regarding electricity.

Audio Lectures
MP3 shiurim by Rabbi Moshe Heinemann

References

External links
Agudath Israel of Baltimore

American Haredi rabbis
American people of German-Jewish descent
German emigrants to the United States
German Haredi rabbis
Living people
Yeshivas Ner Yisroel
Rabbis from Maryland
Religious leaders from Baltimore
Exponents of Jewish law
Year of birth missing (living people)
21st-century American Jews